The Children of Creuse refers to 2,150 children forcibly moved from Réunion to rural metropolitan France between 1963 and 1982. It is well known in Reunion, where it is called the affaire des Enfants de la Creuse or affaire des Réunionnais de la Creuse.

These children, "abandoned or not", were declared by the French authorities of the Department for Health and Social Affairs to be wards of the state. They were transported by the authorities from Reunion, in order to repopulate metropolitan departments mostly in the empty diagonal such as Creuse, Tarn, Gers, Lozère and East Pyrenees which had lost population to the movement from rural areas to metropolitan areas.

This forcible transport of children was organized under the leadership of Michel Debré, MP for Reunion at the time.

Some were adopted, others stayed in homes or served as slave labor on the farms; the peasants across the Creuse then using them as handymen or workers without wages. Le Monde reports, in addition to cases of economic exploitation, cases of child abuse by the French adoptive families.

These displaced children were declared wards of the state, that is to say, the French government took away the parental rights of their birth parents; only a small number of these children were actually orphans. Hundreds of Réunion parents were forced to sign reports of abandonment that they could not decipher, and they never saw their children again.

In August 1968, in their newspaper Témoignages, the Reunionese people denounced a “child trafficking;” however, this state scandal was only publicized in the 2000s.

DDASS officials (France’s department of social services) lied to Reunionese parents from whom they removed their children, and led them to believe that their children  would experience an enviable life in metropolitan France; in fact, some have become workers, others were unemployed.

See also 
 Home Children, a similar program where British children were sent to colonies

References

20th century in Réunion
Forced migrations in Europe